NKK is an abbreviation and may refer to:

 NKK switches (NKK SWITCHES CO., LTD.)
 JFE Holdings, Inc., a corporation formed in 2002 with the merger of NKK (Nippon Kokan, unrelated to Nihon Kaiheiki) and Kawasaki Steel Corporation.
 Nordisk Kemiteknolog Konferens, an annual conference for engineering students from the four Nordic countries: Denmark, Finland, Norway and Sweden.
Norrköpings KK, a Swedish swim team.
Nippon Kinkyori Airways, now Air Nippon